American Criminal Justice Association–Lambda Alpha Epsilon (AJCA-ΛΑΕ) is a coed international professional fraternity in the field of Criminal Justice.

History

Name Changes
At the Annual Grand Chapter Business Meeting in 1970 in Anaheim, California, the name was changed from Lambda Alpha Epsilon, Professional Law Enforcement Fraternity to Lambda Alpha Epsilon, Professional Criminal Justice Fraternity. In the February 1973 it was proposed that the name be changed to Lambda Alpha Epsilon – American Criminal Justice Association, which was then adopted. The name was adopted later in the year. In 1976, the name was reversed to "American Criminal Justice Association – Lambda Alpha Epsilon." In 1980, the general membership voted that it shall take a 90% vote of the general membership to change the Association’s name.

See also 
Professional fraternities and sororities

References

Professional fraternities and sororities in the United States
Student organizations established in 1937
1937 establishments in California